Denise Ryan may refer to:

Denise Ryan, participant in an Irish reality television series Operation Transformation
Denise Ryan, writer of popular fiction RBC Bronwen Wallace Award for Emerging Writers runner up